Dylan Michael-Frank Borczak (born June 13, 1999) is an American professional soccer player who currently plays for Memphis 901 in USL Championship.

Career

Youth
Borczak attended Western International High School in Detroit, Michigan, where he was a two-time team MVP as both a junior and senior. He also played club soccer for Eastside FC.

College & Amateur
In 2017, Borczak attended Schoolcraft College to play college soccer in the NJCAA. In a single season with the Ocelots, Borczak made 19 appearances, scoring five goals and tallying 11 assists, helping the team all the way to the National Championship.

In 2018, Borczak transferred to NCAA Division I college Oakland University. He went on to make 56 appearances, scoring 16 goals and adding 15 assists to his name. Borczak was a two-time All-Horizon League First Team winner, Horizon League Offensive Player of the Year in the 2020–21 season, and All-Horizon League second team selection in his senior year.

Whilst at college, Borczak appeared for United Premier Soccer League sides Oakland County FC and Carpathia FC. Between 2019 and 2021, he played in the USL League Two side Flint City Bucks, helping them to become the 2019 USL League Two season champions. Prior to the 2021 season, Borczak was named to the MAC Hermann Trophy Watch List.

Professional
On March 2, 2022, Borczak signed his first professional contact with USL Championship side Rio Grande Valley FC. He made his debut on March 12, 2022, starting in 1–0 win over Oakland Roots.

On September 30, 2022, it was announced that Borczak had joined Memphis 901 on a multi-year deal for an undisclosed fee.

Honors

Club
Flint City Bucks
USL League Two: 2019

References

External links
 

1999 births
Living people
American soccer players
Association football forwards
Flint City Bucks players
Memphis 901 FC players
Oakland Golden Grizzlies men's soccer players
People from Detroit
Rio Grande Valley FC Toros players
Soccer players from Michigan
Sportspeople from Detroit
USL Championship players
USL League Two players
Western International High School alumni